Pine River is an  river in the U.S. state of Wisconsin. It is a tributary of the Menominee River and flows through Forest and Florence counties.

The Pine River collects the Popple River below Wisconsin Highway 101.  The Pine River has one dam just below La Salle Falls.  It empties into the Menominee River a few miles northwest of Kingsford, Michigan.

References

Rivers of Wisconsin
Bodies of water of Florence County, Wisconsin
Rivers of Forest County, Wisconsin